Souk-el-Khemis Airfield is an abandoned World War II military airfield in Tunisia, located approximately 3 km southeast of Bou Salem, and 110 km west-southwest of Tunis.   It was a temporary airfield built by the US Army Corps of Engineers, used by the United States Army Air Force Twelfth Air Force and by the Royal Air Force during the North African Campaign.
 
Use by US forces included the 325th Fighter Group during 3–19 June 1943, flying P-40 Warhawks.
 
Use by the RAF was primarily in the first 3 weeks of May 1943, during which time No.255 Squadron maintained a detachment there. Tracing such use can be problematic, because the RAF referred to the airfield only by a codename, which was "Paddington".

After the 325th moved east, the airfield was dismantled and abandoned.   Today, there is little evidence of its existence other than the outlines of the perimeter track being used for agricultural roads.

Royal Air Force
The Royal Air Force operated from a number of separate airfields around Souk-el-Khemis:
Paddington - 32, 81, 152, 154, 232, 242, 255 and 261 Squadrons
Victoria - 154 and 232 Squadron 
Marylebone - 242 Squadron
Waterloo - 111 and 225 Squadron
Euston - 72, 93, 241 and 243 Squadrons
Kings Cross - 18 and 114 Squadrons

Bibliography

 Maurer, Maurer. Air Force Combat Units of World War II. Maxwell AFB, Alabama: Office of Air Force History, 1983. .

References

External links

Airfields of the United States Army Air Forces in Tunisia
Airports established in 1943